The 2009 Penza Cup was a professional tennis tournament played on Hard court. This was the fourth edition of the tournament which was part of the 2009 ATP Challenger Tour. It took place in Penza, Russia between 20 July and 26 July 2009.

Singles entrants

Seeds

 Rankings are as of July 13, 2009.

Other entrants
The following players received wildcards into the singles main draw:
  Nikoloz Basilashvili
  Mikhail Biryukov
  Vladislav Dubinsky
  Anton Manegin

The following players received entry from the qualifying draw:
  Mikhail Fufygin
  Sergei Krotiouk
  Mikhail Ledovskikh
  Aleksander Vasin

Champions

Singles

 Mikhail Kukushkin def.  Illya Marchenko, 6–4, 6–2

Doubles

 Mikhail Elgin /  Alexander Kudryavtsev def.  Alexey Kedryuk /  Denis Matsukevich, 4–6, 6–3, [10–6]

References
ITF Search 
2009 Draws

Penza Cup
Penza Cup
2009 in Russian tennis